Ron Fountain (born 16 June 1935) is a former Australian rules footballer who played with St Kilda in the Victorian Football League (VFL).

Notes

External links 

Living people
1935 births
Australian rules footballers from Victoria (Australia)
St Kilda Football Club players
Dandenong Football Club players